The 1979 Australian Tourist Trophy was a motor race staged at the Winton circuit in Victoria, Australia on 28 October 1979. It was open to Group A Sports Cars and was recognized by the Confederation of Australian Motor Sport as an Australian Title. The race, which was the seventeenth Australian Tourist Trophy, was won by Paul Gibson, driving a Rennmax Repco.

Results

Race statistics
 Race distance: 40 laps, 57.7 miles, 81.2 km
 Pole Position: Paul Gibson
 Race time of winning car: 42.30.0 
 Fastest lap: 61.1 - Paul Gibson & Stuart Kostera
 Number of starters: Not yet ascertained
 Number of finishers: Not yet ascertained

References & notes

External links
 Paul Gibson, Rennmax & David Richardson, Matich SR3a - Winton - 28 October 1979 - Photographer Darren House, autopics.com.au 

Australian Tourist Trophy
Tourist Trophy
Motorsport in Victoria (Australia)